This was a new event in 2012.

Marie-Ève Pelletier and Shelby Rogers won the title, defeating Lauren Embree and Nicole Gibbs in the final, 6–3, 3–6, [12–10].

Seeds

Draw

Draw

References
 Main Draw

Colorado International - Doubles